The Astra-Torres airships were non-rigid airships built by Société Astra in France between about 1908 and 1922 to a design by the Spaniard Leonardo Torres Quevedo. They had a highly-characteristic tri-lobed cross-section rather than the more usual circular cross-section. This was the result of moving most of the blimp's bracing wires inside the envelope in an attempt to minimise drag. Early Astra-Torres airships could be trimmed by moving the entire gondola fore-and-aft.

Astra-Torres airships were used by the French Navy during the First World War and for a few years before and after. A few of these were transferred to the American expeditionary forces in Europe, and AT-1, AT-13 and AT-17 were eventually taken back to the United States.

Britain's Royal Naval Air Service purchased AT-14, AT-17 and AT-19, these becoming HMA No. 3, HMA No. 8 and HMA No. 16 respectively. They went through testing and evaluation at RNAS Kingsnorth before all were later taken out of service in May 1916, although the Astra-Torres design was imitated in Britain's own Coastal class blimps that served through to the end of the War.

After the war, AT-16 was operated by Transaérienne, carrying sightseeing passengers over Paris, and AT-24 was purchased by the Japanese Navy.

Operators

French Navy

Imperial Japanese Navy - The IJN purchased a Nieuport AT-2 from France in 1922, shortly after losing its first airship, a British SS class airship, in an explosion. It was assembled at Tokorozawa in 1923 and stationed at Kasumigaura Air Base later that year. It was dismantled in 1924.

Royal Naval Air Service

See also
 1911 in aviation

References

External links

Airships of France
Airships of the United Kingdom